An election to Mayo County Council took place on 10 June 1999 as part of that year's Irish local elections. 31 councillors were elected from seven local electoral areas  for a five-year term of office on the system of proportional representation by means of the single transferable vote (PR-STV).

Results by party

Results by Electoral Area

Ballina

Ballinrobe

Belmullet

Castlebar

Claremorris

Swinford

Westport

External links
 Official website

1999 Irish local elections
1999